Murder 4 Hire is the fourth studio album by American heavy metal band Body Count. Released on August 1, 2006, this was the first album from Body Count in nine years. It is the band's first album following the deaths of drummer Beatmaster V and rhythm guitarist D-Roc the Executioner in 1996 and 2004, respectively. Although, D-Roc did contribute to the album before he died, and work on the album had come to a pause as a result of D-Roc's death. The rest of the rhythm guitar tracks were handled by Bendrix. It is the only album to feature O.T. on drums and the only one recorded without sampler and backing vocalist Sean E Sean. It is also their first album recorded without hype man Sean E. Mac.

Frontman Ice-T later told Esquire Magazine he was not satisfied with the way the album came out because he was not as involved in the project as he usually tries to be.

Track listing 
All tracks composed by Ice-T and Ernie C; except where indicated.

Personnel
Ice-T – lead vocals
Ernie C – lead guitar
D-Roc the Executioner – rhythm guitar
Bendrix – rhythm guitar
Vincent Price – bass guitar
O. T. – drums

Guest musician
Trigga tha Gambler – guest vocals on "Invincible Gangsta"

References

2006 albums
Body Count (band) albums